Olga Nemeș (born 9 June 1968) is a female former international table tennis player from Germany.

Table tennis career
She won a bronze medal for Germany at the 1997 World Table Tennis Championships in the Corbillon Cup (women's team event) with Christina Fischer, Elke Schall, Jie Schöpp and Nicole Struse.

She represented West Germany and Germany during the 1988, 1992 and 1996 Olympic Games.

See also
 List of World Table Tennis Championships medalists

References

German female table tennis players
Romanian female table tennis players
Living people
1968 births
World Table Tennis Championships medalists
Olympic table tennis players of West Germany
Olympic table tennis players of Germany
Table tennis players at the 1988 Summer Olympics
Table tennis players at the 1992 Summer Olympics
Table tennis players at the 1996 Summer Olympics
Sportspeople from Târgu Mureș